Stryken Station is located on the Gjøvik Line at Stryken, Lunner, Norway. The station was opened on 1 November 1917, after Vy Gjøvikbanen stated operating of the line on 11 June 2006, but the station has a very limited service, with only selected trains stopping on Saturdays and Sundays during the winter to provide access to the Association for the Promotion of Skiing's extensive ski trail network in Nordmarka.

External links 
  Entry at Jernbaneverket <
 Entry at the Norwegian Railway Club

References

Railway stations in Lunner
Railway stations on the Gjøvik Line
Railway stations opened in 1917
1917 establishments in Norway